The 2007 French Super Series is the tenth tournament of the 2007 BWF Super Series in badminton. It was held in Paris, France from October 30 to November 4, 2007.

Men's singles

Seeds
 Lin Dan
 Lee Chong Wei
 Chen Jin
 Bao Chunlai
 Chen Yu
 Chen Hong
 Peter Gade
 Taufik Hidayat

Results

Women's singles

Seeds
 Xie Xingfang
 Zhang Ning
 Zhu Lin
 Lu Lan
 Wang Chen
 Pi Hongyan
 Xu Huaiwen
 Yao Jie

Results

Men's doubles

Seeds
 Koo Kien Keat / Tan Boon Heong
 Fu Haifeng / Cai Yun
 Markis Kido / Hendra Setiawan
 Jung Jae-sung / Lee Yong-dae
 Choong Tan Fook / Lee Wan Wah
 Jens Eriksen / Martin Lundgaard Hansen
 Luluk Hadiyanto / Alvent Yulianto
 Lars Paaske / Jonas Rasmussen

Results

Women's doubles

Seeds
 Zhang Yawen / Wei Yili
 Yang Wei / Zhang Jiewen
 Lee Kyung-won / Lee Hyo-jung
 Chien Yu Chin / Cheng Wen-Hsing
 Zhao Tingting / Yu Yang
 Kumiko Ogura / Reiko Shiota
 Jiang Yanmei / Li Yujia
 Gail Emms / Donna Kellogg

Results

Mixed doubles

Seeds
 Gao Ling / Zheng Bo
 Lilyana Natsir / Nova Widianto
 Zhang Yawen / Xie Zhongbo
 Vita Marissa / Flandy Limpele
 Gail Emms / Nathan Robertson
 Kamilla Rytter Juhl / Thomas Laybourn
 Donna Kellogg / Anthony Clark
 Yu Yang / He Hanbin

Results

External links
Official Website
Tournamentsoftware.com: French Super Series 2007

French Open (badminton)
French Super Series, 2007
French